Yeasin Arafat Mishu (born 7 October 1998) is a Bangladeshi cricketer. He made his first-class debut for Chittagong Division in the 2016–17 National Cricket League on 25 September 2016. He took a five-wicket haul in the first innings and was named man of the match. He made his List A debut for Brothers Union in the 2016–17 Dhaka Premier Division Cricket League on 20 April 2017.

Domestic career
On 14 March 2018, bowling for Gazi Group Cricketers against Abahani Limited in the 2017–18 Dhaka Premier Division Cricket League, Arafat became the first Bangladeshi bowler to take eight wickets in a List A match. He finished with figures of 8 for 40 from 8.1 overs. It was the first eight-wicket haul in List A cricket since 2010.

In August 2019, he was one of 35 cricketers named in a training camp ahead of Bangladesh's 2019–20 season. He made his Twenty20 debut on 31 May 2021, for Mohammedan Sporting Club in the 2021 Dhaka Premier Division Twenty20 Cricket League.

International career
In September 2019, he was named in Bangladesh's first two T20Is squad for the 2019–20 Bangladesh Tri-Nation Series. However, he could not play due to injury and he was replaced by Abu Haider. He was later dropped from the squad for the next two T20Is.

References

External links
 

1998 births
Living people
Bangladeshi cricketers
Brothers Union cricketers
Chittagong Division cricketers
Gazi Group cricketers
Mohammedan Sporting Club cricketers
People from Noakhali District